Jacqueline Cako and Nina Stojanović were the defending champions, but Stojanović chose not participate. Cako played alongside Prarthana Thombare, but lost in the quarterfinals to Guo Hanyu and Xun Fangying.

Misaki Doi and Nao Hibino won the title, defeating Luksika Kumkhum and Peangtarn Plipuech in the final, 6–2, 6–3.

Seeds

Draw

Draw

References
Main Draw

Suzhou Ladies Open - Doubles